Margareta von Ascheberg (9 July 1671 – 26 October 1753) was a Swedish land owner, noble and acting regiment colonel during the Great Northern War.

Early life and marriage 
Margareta von Ascheberg was the youngest child of Field Marshal Rutger von Ascheberg and Magdalena Eleonora Busseck. 

On 26 January 1691, she married colonel count Kjell Christopher Barnekow (d. 1700) in Malmö. As was the custom of the Swedish nobility as that time, she kept her name after marriage and style herself »Grevinnan Ascheberg» (Countess Ascheberg). The couple had four children. She accompanied her spouse on his military commissions: she gave birth to their youngest sons during the Bombardment of Brussels in 1695. 

At the outbreak of the Great Northern War, Kjell Christopher Barnekow was called to Sweden and appointed colonel of the Scanian dragoons, which he undertook to equip himself. However, he died very suddenly and unexpectedly of a fever 19 December 1700 before he had the time to fulfill his task.

Madame Colonel 
As a widow, Margareta von Ascheberg was left with the responsibility of her four minor children and the management of their estates as well as the other responsibilities of her late spouse. This included the task of the command and equipment of his Scanian regiment. She was not freed from this responsibility, and the acting colonel Kr. A. v. Buchwaldt was appointed to see that she fulfilled her task. In the spring of 1702, she had performed the task of a colonel by having organized and equipped the regiment and appointed its officers ready for inspection by the royal command and ready to serve in the war. She also sat at the inspection office of the regiment when it was sent to war from Kristianstad. 

During the war, she took care of the continued equipment and affairs of the regiment, and exchanged letters with Charles XII of Sweden about its appointments and promotions. She was called "Coloneless" or Madame Colonel. She was admired for "The energy and care, with which she performed her unusual task, a circumstance, which in other cases would seem impossible for a woman".

Estate management 
Margareta von Ascheberg was also given the responsibility of the estates of her spouse, including Vittskövle, Rosendal and Örtofta in Scania, Gammel-Kjöge on Själland, Ralsvik and Streu on Rügen, and she also added the estate of Ugerup in Scania to it. She herself inherited and acquired the additional estates of Eliinge, Sövdeborg and Tosterup. 

She was a very successful business person and land owner and recommended for her efficiency. She founded schools, hospitals and gave anonymous donations to the poor in the parishes of her estates, and in contrast to other contemporary land owners, such as the hated Christina Piper, she managed to make herself popular among her employees. She was called "A true mother of the household" and was admired for her "unusual accomplishment, which should not be interpreted dishonestly, as the whole of Scania can testify for it to be truthful". In the parish of Vittskövle, where she preferred to reside, "The Ascheberg woman" became a respected figure of folklore.

See also 
 Maria Sofia De la Gardie

References 
 Anteckningar om svenska qvinnor / 
 Margaretha Ascheberg, von, urn:sbl:18867, Svenskt biografiskt lexikon (art av Gunnar Carlquist.), hämtad 2014-12-28.

Further reading
 

1671 births
1753 deaths
Women in 18th-century warfare
Swedish people of German descent
Swedish people of the Great Northern War
17th-century Swedish landowners
Swedish countesses
Women in war in Sweden
18th-century Swedish military personnel
18th-century women landowners
18th-century Swedish landowners